Seán Treacy (born 1996) is an Irish hurler who plays for Dublin Senior Championship club Cuala. He is a former member of the Dublin senior hurling team, with whom he usually lined out as a forward.

Career

Treacy first came to prominence at club level during a golden age for the Cuala club. He lined out in the forwards and at midfield when the club won consecutive All-Ireland Club Championship titles in 2017 and 2018. He has also won two Leinster Club Championship titles. At inter-county level, Treacy was an All-Ireland runner-up with the Dublin minor team in 2012, before winning a Leinster Under-21 Championship medal with the Dublin under-21 team in 2016. Treacy was drafted onto the Dublin senior hurling team in 2016 and lined out at several times until 2019. His brother, David Treacy, aloso played with Dublin.

Honours

Cuala
All-Ireland Senior Club Hurling Championship: 2017, 2018
Leinster Senior Club Hurling Championship: 2016, 2017
Dublin Senior Hurling Championship: 2015, 2016, 2017, 2019, 2020

Dublin
Walsh Cup: 2016
Leinster Under-21 Hurling Championship: 2016
Leinster Minor Hurling Championship: 2012

References

1995 births
Living people
Cuala hurlers
Dublin inter-county hurlers
Irish schoolteachers